John Easdale (born September 20, 1961 in Wayne, New Jersey) is the lead singer and songwriter for the American band Dramarama.

Easdale grew up in Wayne, New Jersey, and graduated from Wayne Hills High School.

References

External links
 

Living people
1961 births
People from Wayne, New Jersey
Dramarama members
Wayne Hills High School alumni
Singer-songwriters from New Jersey